Grange Park, London may refer to:

Grange Park, Enfield
Kilburn Grange Park